Kholeno is a mountain in Kholeno/Azadkouh massif in central Alborz Range located in Tehran province near the border of Mazandaran Province. The most commonly used trail to Kholeno summit is on the mountain's southern slopes, starting from Lalan. This route, however, is exposed to avalanche risk during the winter.

Kholeno has two summits of which the tallest (4375 m) is located at the north of the shorter (4348 m).

References

Mountains of Tehran Province
Landforms of Tehran Province
Four-thousanders of the Alborz
Mountains of Iran